St Helens was a constituency in the county of Lancashire, England.  It returned one Member of Parliament (MP) to the House of Commons of the UK Parliament.

Created by the Redistribution of Seats Act 1885, the constituency was abolished in 1983, being split into North and South seats.

Boundaries 
1885–1918: The municipal borough of St Helens.

1918–1983: The County Borough of St Helens.

Members of Parliament

Elections

Elections in the 1880s

Elections in the 1890s

Elections in the 1900s

Elections in the 1910s 

General Election 1914–15:
Another General Election was required to take place before the end of 1915. The political parties had been making preparations for an election to take place and by the July 1914, the following candidates had been selected; 
Unionist: Rigby Swift
Labour: James Sexton

Elections in the 1920s

Elections in the 1930s

General Election 1939–40:
Another General Election was required to take place before the end of 1940. The political parties had been making preparations for an election to take place and by the Autumn of 1939, the following candidates had been selected; 
Labour: William Robinson
Conservative: S J Hill

Election in the 1940s

Elections in the 1950s

Elections in the 1960s

Elections in the 1970s

Sources

References

Parliamentary constituencies in North West England (historic)
Constituencies of the Parliament of the United Kingdom established in 1885
Constituencies of the Parliament of the United Kingdom disestablished in 1983
Politics of the Metropolitan Borough of St Helens